The Nipissing Lakers men's ice hockey team is the ice hockey team that represents Nipissing University in North Bay, Ontario. It was granted membership in the OUA's men's ice hockey circuit in 2009.

Team history

Conferences
Ontario University Athletics (2009–present)

Season-by-Season Results

Note: GP = Games played, W = Wins, L = Losses, OTL = Overtime/shootout losses

Records as of 05/18/2017.

Arena
'''Memorial Gardens Sports Arena (2009–present)
Capacity: 4000
Constructed: 1955
Largest crowd at a Lakers game: 3374 vs. Queen's (Lakers' first ever home game.)

Media 
Since the Lakers inaugural season, all home games are televised on TVCogeco, and all away games are broadcast on AM 600 CKAT.

The broadcasters for the Lakers on TVCogeco are Ranjan Rupal on play-by-play, Greg Theberge on colour commentary, and Claude Sharma as the rinkside reporter. Bob Coles is the play-by play announcer on CKAT.

References 

U Sports men's ice hockey teams
Ice hockey teams in Ontario
Nipissing University
2009 establishments in Ontario
Ice hockey clubs established in 2009
Sport in North Bay, Ontario